The 2007 J&S Cup was a Tier II event on the 2007 WTA Tour that ran from April 30 - May 6, 2007. It was held in Warsaw, Poland, and was the 12th year that the event was staged. Justine Henin won her second Warsaw title and third overall of the year after other victories in Dubai and Doha.

The event was also Kim Clijsters' last professional tournament before taking a break from the sport to start a family. The Belgian lost in the second round to qualifier Julia Vakulenko, and just a few days after announced her retirement from professional tennis. She would eventually return to the sport in 2009 after giving birth to a daughter in 2008.

Entrants

Seeds

 Seedings are based on the rankings of April 23, 2007.

Other entrants
The following players received wildcards into the main draw:

  Katarzyna Piter
  Urszula Radwańska

The following players received entry from the qualifying draw:

  Kateryna Bondarenko
  Tamira Paszek
  Tsvetana Pironkova
  Julia Vakulenko

Finals

Singles

 Justine Henin defeated  Alona Bondarenko, 6–1, 6–3
 It was Justine Henin third title of the year, and second J&S Cup title.

Doubles

 Vera Dushevina /  Tatiana Perebiynis defeated  Elena Likhovtseva /  Elena Vesnina, 7–5, 3–6, [10–2]

External links
WTA Profile
Singles, Doubles and Qualifying Draw

JandS Cup
Warsaw Open
War